Proceed may refer to:

 Proceeds, the total amount of income generated by the sale of goods and services
 Kia Proceed, a 2019–present South Korean compact shooting brake
 Mazda Proceed, a 1966–2006 Japanese pickup truck